Joychandi Pahar Junction railway station (station code: JOC) serves Adra town and Raghunathpur in Purulia district in the Indian state of West Bengal. It was named after the hill called Joychandi Pahar which is located between these two towns.
Joychandipahar rail station is situated on the Asansol–Purulia–Sini main line section. In the year of 2014 it was redeveloped and made as an alternative station of Adra Junction to decongest Adra station from a huge passenger and freight traffic.

History
Later it was modified as the bypass rail station of Adra Junction to decongest Adra station .

Electrification
The Tatanagar–Adra–Asansol section was electrified in the 1957–1962 period.

New station building

A new station building at Joychandi Pahar railway station was inaugurated on 4 February 2013 by Adhir Ranjan Chowdhury, Union minister of state for Railways.

References

External links 
 Trains at Joychandi Pahar

Adra railway division
Railway stations in Purulia district
Railway stations in India opened in 1891